I Propose We Never See Each Other Again After Tonight is a 2020 Canadian romantic comedy film directed by Sean Garrity. The film stars Kristian Jordan and Hera Nalam as Simon Friesen and Iris Dela Cruz, a man and woman in Winnipeg who meet when they both stop to help push a car out of the snow, and become a couple over the course of the film despite their initial lack of interest in each other.

Garrity chose to write the two central characters as a Mennonite and a Filipino Canadian, as both communities are prominent within Winnipeg but rarely represented in film.

The film had been slated to premiere in March 2020, but was disrupted by the COVID-19 pandemic in Canada. Its premiere was rescheduled to August; Garrity contrasted its adjusted release strategy against the concurrent Christopher Nolan film Tenet, noting that the social distancing strategies still in place at movie theatres would complicate the release of a Hollywood film but were not all that different from the much smaller audiences that turn out for Canadian independent films even in normal times.

References

External links

2020 films
2020 independent films
2020 romantic comedy films
Canadian independent films
Canadian romantic comedy films
English-language Canadian films
Films directed by Sean Garrity
Films postponed due to the COVID-19 pandemic
Films set in Winnipeg
Films shot in Winnipeg
2020s English-language films
2020s Canadian films